Stonelick is an unincorporated community in Clermont County, in the U.S. state of Ohio.

History
A post office called Stone Lick was established in 1859, the name was changed to Stonelick in 1895, and the post office closed in 1900. The community takes its name from nearby Stonelick Creek.

References

Unincorporated communities in Clermont County, Ohio
Unincorporated communities in Ohio